Henrik Rasmussen (born 13 June 1968) is a Danish former professional footballer who made 322 appearances in the Superliga for AaB.

References

1968 births
Living people
Danish men's footballers
Danish Superliga players
Association football midfielders
AaB Fodbold players